Bigamy is a 1927 German silent drama film directed by Jaap Speyer and starring Heinrich George, Maria Jacobini, and Anita Dorris.

Cast

Plot
Plumber Otto Engel has been abandoned by his wife Ada. He gets along really well with Elise, the girl living above his workshop and store. When he finally musters up the courage to ask her out to a variety show, he is utterly shocked to see his runaway wife Ada on stage as a dancer. Otto and Ada decide to try and patch up their marriage, so she returns home. But the theatre keeps drawing Ada and after a short time she leaves for the second time. Elise puts Otto back on his feet again and the two choose to live together. When Ada does not respond to his request for divorce, Otto arranges a false death certificate. Otto and Elise get married, are happy and have a son. Until Ada suddenly returns and accuses Otto of bigamy. In court, Ada is deeply impressed by Elise and Otto's son. She takes some poison and dies on the spot. The Engel family can live on in peace.

Bibliography

External links

1927 films
Films of the Weimar Republic
German silent feature films
German drama films
Films directed by Jaap Speyer
Terra Film films
1927 drama films
German black-and-white films
Silent drama films
1920s German films